Henrique Eduardo Lyra Alves (born December 9, 1948) is a Brazilian politician. A member of the Brazilian Democratic Movement Party, he was the President of the Chamber of Deputies (Speaker) of Brazil from 2013 to 2015.

References

|-

|-

1948 births
Living people
Ministers of Tourism of Brazil
Presidents of the Chamber of Deputies (Brazil)
Brazilian Democratic Movement politicians
Politicians from Rio de Janeiro (city)
Members of the Chamber of Deputies (Brazil) from Rio Grande do Norte